ISO 9897 is an ISO international standard for electronic interchange relating to freight containers. It is also known as CEDEX as an acronym of Container Equipment Data Exchange, and "is intended for business entities for use in communications relating to freight container transactions, in particular container Maintenance & Repair estimates and approvals and repair status messages".

09897
Intermodal containers